Rakshit Atluri, commonly known as Rakshith, is an Indian actor who works in the Telugu film industry. Atluri made his debut with London Babulu (2017) for which he received the best debut actor award at 16th Santosham Film Awards. In 2020, he starred in the action thriller film Palasa 1978 as Mohan Rao.

Personal life and career
Rakshit was born and brought up in Vijayawada, Andhra Pradesh, India. He made his debut in the Telugu film industry with the 2017 film London Babulu directed by Chinni Krishna, and then he was selected to play the lead role in the 2020 film Palasa 1978, in which he played Mohan Rao in three different age groups. He was first seen as an 18-year-old, then 24, 40 and finally as a 60-year-old. He also learnt to speak Telugu in a dialect that fit the Palasa region in 45 days.

Filmography

Awards

References

Year of birth missing (living people)
Living people
Male actors from Vijayawada
21st-century Indian male actors
Male actors in Telugu cinema